Hipcrime may refer to:

The Hipcrime Vocab, a fictional book in the 1968 novel Stand on Zanzibar
Hipcrime (Usenet), a notorious Usenet vandal, and the software presumably written by this individual.